Mario Bencastro (born 1949) is a Salvadoran novelist and painter who has also written both plays and short stories that have been published in Spanish and English.

Mario Bencastro was born in Ahuachapán, El Salvador. For over 20 years he resided in Northern Virginia, United States near Washington DC, but in recent years he has moved to Port Saint Lucie, Florida. His works primarily concern the Salvadoran Civil War and its aftermath, including the Salvadoran Diaspora.

Select bibliography 

Novels
 El árbol de la vida, (1983)
 Disparo en la catedral, (1989)
 Odisea del norte, (1998)

Drama
 Crossroads (1988)

References

External links 

 Mario Bencastro recorded for the literary archive in the Hispanic Division at the Library of Congress on July 19, 1999.
 Website Mario Bencastro

Consuelo Hernández. "El inmigrante como sujeto polidimensional en Viaje a la tierra del abuelo". MACLAS. Latin American Essays 2011. MACLAS James Street Prize 2011.
Consuelo Hernández. ""El cronista de la guerra civil y la diáspora salvadoreña. Entrevista con Mario Bencastro." Antípodas XXI. Journal of Hispanic and Galician Studies. Australia, 2010.

1949 births
Living people

Salvadoran emigrants to the United States
20th-century Salvadoran painters
21st-century Salvadoran painters
Salvadoran novelists
People from Ahuachapán
Salvadoran dramatists and playwrights
Male novelists
Salvadoran short story writers
Male short story writers
Male dramatists and playwrights
20th-century novelists
20th-century dramatists and playwrights
Salvadoran male writers
20th-century short story writers
20th-century male writers
20th-century Salvadoran writers